Craig Wood may refer to:
 
Craig Wood (golfer) (1901–1968), professional golfer
Craig Wood (guitarist) (born 1978), guitarist for Avril Lavigne
Craig Wood (film editor), film editor
 Craig Wood, an entry on the List of Sites of Special Scientific Interest in Cumnock and Kyle

See also
Craig Woods, actor from the 1940s